The men's discus throw event at the 1970 Summer Universiade was held at the Stadio Comunale in Turin on 5 and 6 September 1970.

Medalists

Results

Qualification

Final

References

Athletics at the 1970 Summer Universiade
1970